Squash competitions at the 2003 Pan American Games was held from August 10 to August 15 in Santo Domingo, Dominican Republic.

Men's competition

Singles

Team

Women's competition

Singles

Team

Notes

Medal table

References
 Sports 123
 worldsquash
 squashflash

W
2003
Events at the 2003 Pan American Games